The Stockdale Shales is a geologic formation in England. It preserves fossils dating back to the Silurian period.

The shales were named by W. Talbot Aveline from the beck and hamlet of that name in Longsleddale.

See also

 List of fossiliferous stratigraphic units in England
 Stockdale Group

References

 

Geologic formations of England
Silurian System of Europe
Silurian England
Slate formations